The Penang ambush was an incident that took place during the Malayan Emergency. Communists ambushed Malayan and British police and killed eight of them, including a British police sergeant.

References

External links

Wars involving the United Kingdom
Malayan Emergency
January 1950 events in Asia
1950 in Malaya
Ambushes